Figuralchor der Gedächtniskirche Stuttgart is a mixed church- and concert choir based in Stuttgart, Germany. It was established in 1957 by Helmuth Rilling. Rilling conducted the choir in several recordings of his project to record the complete choral works by Johann Sebastian Bach. Rilling led the group until the 1970s, when several students took over, first the Americans Henry Gibbons and Gordon Plaine. In 1990 the choir went on a concert tour of the United States, conducted by Johannes Moesus. Peter Bachofer was musical director from 1990, Alexander Burda from 2009.

Recordings 
 1962 Heinrich Schütz: Psalm 116 
 1962 Bach: , Missa in A, BWV 234
 1963 Handel: Belsazar
 1963 Bach: , with the chorales for the liturgical year
 1965 .  (Motets. concertos and choral music by old masters)
 1965 Bach: Was mir behagt, ist nur die muntre Jagd, BWV 208
 1966 Mozart: Coronation Mass, K. 317 , K. 339
 1966 Bach: Missa in g, BWV 235
 1966 Bach: Magnificat in E-flat major, BWV 243a, Dieterich Buxtehude: Magnificat
 1966 Bach: 
 1966 Bach: 
 1966 Bach: 
 1966 Bach: 
 1966 Anton Bruckner: Mass No. 2
 1967 Bach: 
 1967 Bach:

References

German choirs
Musical groups from Stuttgart
Musical groups established in 1957
1957 establishments in Germany